Siedlanka  is a village in the administrative district of Gmina Niwiska, within Kolbuszowa County, Subcarpathian Voivodeship, in south-eastern Poland.

The village has a population of 798.

References

Siedlanka